The Botswana Private Medical & Health Services Workers' Union (BPM&HSWU) is a trade union affiliate of the Botswana Federation of Trade Unions in Botswana.

References

Botswana Federation of Trade Unions
Healthcare trade unions in Botswana
Organisations based in Gaborone